Antonio Portela (born 21 April 1966) is a Puerto Rican former swimmer who competed in the 1984 Summer Olympics. He finished twenty-seventh in the 100m freestyle and fourteenth in the 4x400m freestyle relay.

References

1966 births
Living people
Puerto Rican male swimmers
Puerto Rican male freestyle swimmers
Pan American Games competitors for Puerto Rico
Olympic swimmers of Puerto Rico
Swimmers at the 1983 Pan American Games
Swimmers at the 1984 Summer Olympics
Swimmers at the 1987 Pan American Games
20th-century Puerto Rican people